The Michigan Kid is a 1928 American silent drama film directed by Irvin Willat and starring Conrad Nagel, Renée Adorée and Lloyd Whitlock.

Cast
 Conrad Nagel as Michigan Kid / Jim Rowen 
 Renée Adorée as Rose Morris 
 Lloyd Whitlock as Frank Hayward 
 Fred Esmelton as Hiram Morris 
 Adolph Milar as Shorty 
 Maurice Murphy as Jimmy Cowan – as a Child 
 Virginia Grey as Rose – as a Child 
 Don House as Frank Howard – as a Child 
 Walter Brennan as Extra

References

Bibliography
 Munden, Kenneth White. The American Film Institute Catalog of Motion Pictures Produced in the United States, Part 1. University of California Press, 1997.

External links

1928 films
1928 drama films
Silent American drama films
Films directed by Irvin Willat
American silent feature films
1920s English-language films
American black-and-white films
Films based on works by Rex Beach
Universal Pictures films
1920s American films